The 2021–22 season is the club's eight season since its establishment in 2014, and their eight season in the Indian Super League.

Preseason friendlies

Players

Competitions

Indian Super League

AFC Champions League

Group B

Matches

References 

Mumbai City FC seasons
2021–22 Indian Super League season by team